Cicindela oregona, also called the Western tiger beetle, is a species of ground beetles native to North America.

References 

oregona
Beetles of North America
Insects of the United States
Fauna of the Western United States
Natural history of Oregon
Beetles described in 1857